Alessandro Bermani (23 October 1906 – 12 January 1979) was an Italian politician who served as Mayor of Novara from 1956 to 1962 and as Senator for three legislatures (1963–1968, 1968–1972, 1972–1976).

He was the father of historian Cesare Bermani.

References

1906 births
1979 deaths
Mayors of Novara
Senators of Legislature IV of Italy
Senators of Legislature V of Italy
Senators of Legislature VI of Italy
20th-century Italian politicians
Italian Socialist Party politicians
People from Novara